Whitehorse General Hospital is a hospital in Whitehorse, Yukon. It is the biggest hospital in the Yukon, providing 24/7 emergency care, inpatient and ambulatory care, surgical services, cancer care, psychiatric, visiting specialists clinics, therapy and lab services, and advanced diagnostic imaging.  It is currently undergoing an expansion that is expected to be finished in 2017.

The hospital and territory have historically been criticized for not offering dialysis services in the territory.

Facilities 
Whitehorse General Hospital offers community services such as:

 24/7 Emergency Services
 Inpatient and ambulatory care
 Surgery
 Cancer care
 Visiting specialist clinic
 Medical rehabilitation
 Laboratory Services
 Radiology
 First Nations Health Programs

References

External links

Buildings and structures in Whitehorse
Hospitals in Yukon
Hospital buildings completed in 1901